TSS Hibernia was a twin screw steamer passenger vessel operated by the London and North Western Railway from 1920 to 1923, and the London, Midland and Scottish Railway from 1923 to 1948.

History

She was built by William Denny and Brothers of Dumbarton and launched in 1920.

In 1948 she was renamed TSS Hibernia II in preparation for a new vessel of the same name, the MV Hibernia (1949). Only a few months later she was scrapped by the British Transport Commission.

References

1920 ships
Passenger ships of the United Kingdom
Steamships
Ships built on the River Clyde
Ships of the London and North Western Railway